Helensburgh Central railway station serves the town of Helensburgh on the north shore of the Firth of Clyde, near Glasgow, Scotland. The station is a terminus on the North Clyde Line, sited  from Glasgow Queen Street (High Level), measured via Singer and Maryhill. Passenger services are operated by ScotRail on behalf of Strathclyde Partnership for Transport.

The station is Helensburgh's main railway station, the other being the much smaller  on the West Highland Line.

History

The station was opened in 1858 (as Helensburgh), as the terminus of the Glasgow, Dumbarton and Helensburgh Railway and is located in the centre of the town. The GD&HR was taken over by the Edinburgh and Glasgow Railway company in 1862, which in turn was absorbed by the North British Railway three years later. The entire station building and platforms were rebuilt in 1897 to the design of James Carswell.

The route became part of the London and North Eastern Railway at the 1923 Grouping and then the Scottish Region of British Railways at nationalisation on 1 January 1948. It was given its current name in June 1953, with electric operation beginning in November 1960 as part of the North Clyde modernisation scheme.

Three of the four original platforms at the station remain in use, though the old engine shed and signal box have both been closed, the latter in 1989, when the entire North Clyde network came under the control of  signalling centre. The line from Craigendoran Junction had previously been singled in 1984.

Facilities 

The station is well equipped, with a ticket office, a coffee shop, an accessible toilet, waiting rooms, bike racks, various benches, payphones, a help point and a cash machine, as well as an accessible car park. All areas of the station have step-free access, except the Princes Street East entrance to the ticket hall.

Passenger volume 

The statistics cover twelve month periods that start in April.

Services 
On weekdays & Saturdays, there is a typically half-hourly service to Edinburgh Waverley, via Glasgow Queen Street low-level and Airdrie, which skips stations between Dalmuir and Hyndland. On Sundays, the service remains half-hourly, but trains serve all stations via .

References

Bibliography

External links 

 Video footage of Helensburgh Central

Category B listed buildings in Argyll and Bute
Listed railway stations in Scotland
Railway stations in Argyll and Bute
Former North British Railway stations
Railway stations in Great Britain opened in 1858
SPT railway stations
Railway stations served by ScotRail
Helensburgh
1858 establishments in Scotland